Nemiver is computer  software, a graphical standalone debugger for the programming languages C and C++, which integrates in the GNOME desktop environment. It currently features a backend which uses the well known GNU Debugger (GDB). The creator and the current lead developer is Dodji Seketeli.

Features

General 
Users can start debugging source code with Nemiver either directly from the command line by typing
nemiver <your-program> <prog-arg1> <prog-arg2> ... <prog-argN>
or by launching Nemiver first and then using its graphical dialogs to launch the program to debug.

Once the program is launched, Nemiver automatically sets a breakpoint in its main function. Once the program has stopped at the main function, users are free to set breakpoints, inspect variables, investigate the behavior of functions within the code, resume the execution of the program etc.

Sessions 
Nemiver stores some basic information about a debugging session on disk, so that the session can be resumed later. Whenever debugging is started, a new session is created automatically, unless it is explicitly requested to resume an extant session. On exit, the session is automatically saved. Information saved with a session includes breakpoints, program arguments, working directory path, environment variables, etc. Also, the current session can be saved to disk on demand.

Extensions 
Nemiver is a more than a graphical user interface (GUI) debugger for computer code. It is a platform which can be extended with plugins.

The libnemivercommon library provides the basic functions to load dynamic modules and enable a plug-in architecture, and allowing new functionality for the Nemiver workbench. Currently, only the debugging functionality is provided, but others could be added, for example profiling tools such as OProfile, or Valgrind-Massif.

Nemiver also provides an event-based debugger library (which currently features a GDB back-end, but others could be added in the future) that could be re-used by other projects seeking to implement a debugger as a part of an integrated development environment (IDE), for example.

About 
Nemiver is written in C++, and relies on many components of the GNOME platform, such as Gtkmm.

See also 

 Data Display Debugger (DDD), a Motif (software) debugger front-end
 KDbg, a GDB front end that integrates well in the KDE environment
 GNU Debugger (GDB)

External links 
 

Debuggers
Free software programmed in C++
GNOME Developer Tools
Software that uses GTK